The Edinburgh Review is the title of four distinct intellectual and cultural magazines. The best known, longest-lasting, and most influential of the four was the third, which was published regularly from 1802 to 1929.

Edinburgh Review, 1755–56 

The first Edinburgh Review was a short-lived venture initiated in 1755 by the Select Society, a group of Scottish men of letters concerned with the Enlightenment goals of social and intellectual improvement. According to the preface of the inaugural issue, the journal's purpose was to "demonstrate 'the progressive state of learning in this country' and thereby to incite Scots 'to a more eager pursuit of learning, to distinguish themselves, and to do honour to their country.'" As a means to these ends, it would "give a full account of all books published in Scotland within the compass of half a year; and ... take some notice of such books published elsewhere, as are most read in this country, or seem to have any title to draw the public attention." Among the most notable of the foreign publications it observed was Jean-Jacques Rousseau's Discourse on Inequality, which Adam Smith reviewed in the journal's second and final issue, published in March 1756. Its premature folding was due in large part to the partisan attacks the Moderate editors received from their opponents in the Church of Scotland, the Popular Party.

Edinburgh Magazine and Review, 1773–76 
A short-lived magazine with similar purposes, Edinburgh Magazine and Review, was published monthly between 1773 and 1776.

Edinburgh Review, 1802–1929 

The third Edinburgh Review became one of the most influential British magazines of the 19th century. It promoted Romanticism and Whig politics. (It was also, however, notoriously critical of some major Romantic poetry.)

Started on 10 October 1802 by Francis Jeffrey, Sydney Smith, Henry Brougham, and Francis Horner, it was published by Archibald Constable in quarterly issues until 1929. It began as a literary and political review. Under its first permanent editor, Francis Jeffrey (the first issue was edited by Sydney Smith), it was a strong supporter of the Whig party and liberal politics, and regularly called for political reform. Its main rival was the Quarterly Review which supported the Tories. The magazine was also noted for its attacks on the Lake Poets, particularly William Wordsworth.

It was owned at one point by John Stewart, whose wife Louisa Hooper Stewart (1818–1918) was an early advocate of women's suffrage, having been educated at the Quaker school of Newington Academy for Girls.

It took its Latin motto  ("the judge is condemned when the guilty is acquitted") from Publilius Syrus.

The magazine ceased publication in 1929.

Notable contributors to the third Edinburgh Review

Edinburgh Review, [1969] 1984–2014 

The Scottish cultural magazine New Edinburgh Review was founded in 1969. In 1984 (from the combined issue 67/68) it explicitly adopted the title Edinburgh Review, along with the motto To gather all the rays of culture into one. From 2007 to 2012 it was part of the Eurozine network. The most famous issues of the New Edinburgh Review were the 1974 issues, supervised by C. K. Maisels, that discussed the philosophy of Antonio Gramsci.

Notes

Further reading 
 Shattock, Joanne. Politics and Reviewers: the Edinburgh and the Quarterly in the Early Victorian Age. London, Leicester, and New York: Leicester University Press, 1989.
 Christie, William. The Edinburgh Review in the Literary Culture of Romantic Britain. London, Pickering & Chatto, 2009.

External links 
 Facsimile of first edition

Literary magazines published in Scotland
Quarterly magazines published in the United Kingdom
Book review magazines
Culture in Edinburgh
Defunct literary magazines published in the United Kingdom
History of Edinburgh
Magazines established in 1802
Magazines disestablished in 1929
Magazines established in 1984
Mass media in Edinburgh